Charlie Venegas (born February 12, 1967 in San Bernardino, California, United States) is a professional speedway rider in the United States. He represented the USA in the 2007 Speedway World Cup.

Venegas has been USA National Champion twice and has been successful at ice speedway, becoming Indoor Ice Race World Champion four times and lifting the Indoor Ice World Cup three times with USA.

References 

1967 births
Living people
American speedway riders
People from San Bernardino, California